The National Council for Peace is an anti-war and pro-human rights Iranian organization founded in 2007, with an aim to oppose military action against Iran amidst threats by U.S. administration under George W. Bush.

It was a broad coalition of Iranian activists, political leaders, lawyers, artists, students and others who protested against a potential war between Iran and the United States. According to Leila Alikarimi, the group straightened the voice of Iranian civil society by calling for an open dialogue with the Iranian government to enhance the situation of human rights in Iran.

See also 
 List of anti-war organizations

References 

2007 establishments in Iran
Civil rights organizations
Human rights organisations based in Iran
Peace organizations
Political organisations based in Iran